Dowling Creek is a creek located in the Peace River Regional District of British Columbia. It flows northeast into Gething Creek, Williston Lake. The river is located southwest of Hudson's Hope.

References

Rivers of British Columbia
Peace River Regional District